Rajbari is a district in central Bangladesh, located in the Dhaka Division. It is a part of the Greater Faridpur subregion of Bengal due to the historical, linguistic and cultural identities of its inhabitants.

History 
During the reign of Mughal emperor Jahangir, a fief in Padamdi was decreed to the family of an Iraqi Muslim immigrant by the name of Syed Shah Pahlwan in 1607. The zamindari family, known as the Nawabs of Padamdi actively commanded the artillery and served the Mughal army, eventually leading to Emperor Shah Jahan bestowing them the title of Mir.

Rajbari in the Bengali language means palace, and pays homage to the rich zamindari families that feudally ruled modern-day Rajbari. In the 17th century, the Mughal governor of Bengal, Shaista Khan, appointed Sangram Shah of Panchthupi as the Nawara of what is present-day Rajbari in order to suppress the Portuguese pirates. The Nawara settled permanently in the populated neighbourhood of Banibaha and built a fort at a place called Lalgola. Sangram Shah and his family later became known as the Nawara Chowdhuries of Banibaha.

After the Battle of Plassey of 1757, one of Siraj ud-Daulah's officers by the name of Prabhuram went into hiding in Lakshmikol to avoid the British colonialists. Prabhuram's son, Dwigendra Prasad, eventually became a prominent zamindar in the area, and his son Surya Kumar earned the title of Raja. In 1890, the Rajbari railway station was established, and it is said that it was named after Raja Surya Kumar. Other zamindars such as the Nawara Chowdhuries of Banibaha objected to this as the name of Rajbari was said to have been established long before Kumar.

During the Bangladesh Liberation War of 1971, an organisation named the Sangram Parishad (Struggle Council) was established on 26 March. On 21 and 22 April, six Bengali freedom fighters were murdered during an encounter with the Pakistan Army. In the villages of Majhpara, Ramcole and Mathurapur, the army murdered 10 people in addition to setting many houses on fire. The Bengali freedom fighters captured a large amount of equipment and resources from the Army in November. Another brawl took place in that month in the village of Alhadipur leading to 9 Army casualties.

Administration
Once Rajbari region was a part of Jessore District. In 1811 when Faridpur District was formed Rajbari was included in it. Besides, the upazilas under Rajbari district were included in different districts in the past. Pangsha Upazila was once included into Pabna District. In 1859 Pangsha and Baliakandi were included in the newly formed Kumarkhali Upazila. In 1871, when Goalanda Upazila was formed, Pangsha and Rajbari were included in it and its headquarters was established in Rajbari. Goalanda was upgraded into a district in March 1984 and it was renamed as Rajbari District.

Parliamentary seats 
 Rajbari-1
 Rajbari-2

Upazilas 
There are 5 upazilas in this district. They are:
 Baliakandi Upazila
 Goalanda Upazila
 Pangsha Upazila
 Kalukhali Upazila
 Rajbari Sadar Upazila
 Administrator of Zila Porishod: Fakir Abdul Jabbar
 Deputy Commissioner (DC): Dilsad Begum
 Mayor of Rajbari Pouroshova : Mohammad Ali Choudhury

Deputy Commissioner
The DC is the chief administrative and revenue officer of Rajbari District.

Education

Schools
 Rajbari Government High School (also known as Rajbari Zilla School and previously as Goalondo High School)
 Baliakandi Pailot Model High School
 Rajbari Government Girls High School
 R.S.K Institution ( It was established in 1888 by the name of Raja Surja Kumar )
 Rajdharpur Madhyamik Bidyalay
 Baharpur High School
 Kola Sadar Uddin High School
 Atdapunia High School
 Mulghor High School
 Kashbamajail A.H High School
 Suraj Mohini Institute & Tamijuddin Girls High School
 Mohonpur K.B Academy
 Nolia Shyama Mohon Institutions

Colleges
 Rajbari Government College
 Rajbari Government Adarsha Mohila College
 Dr. Abul Hossain University College
 Pangsha Government College
 Baharpur College
 Baliakandi Degree Collage
 Mansur Ali Degree College
 Mir Mosharraf Hossain Degree College
 Jamalpur Degree College

There are also so many Institute which are popularly known by the People.

Geography and climate
Annual average temperature of this district is maximum 35.8 °C and minimum 12.6 °C. Annual rainfall is 2105 mm.

Major rivers 
 Padma
 Jalangi
 Kumar
 Garai
 Madhumati
 Harai
 Chandana
 Chitra

Demographics 

According to the 2011 Bangladesh census, Rajbari District had a population of 1,049,778, of which 519,999 were males and 529,779 were females. Rural population was 913,736 (87.04%) while urban population was 136,042 (12.96%). Rajbari had a literacy rate of 52.28% for the population 7 years and above: 53.98% for males and 50.63% for females.

Religion

The district is predominantly Muslim. Muslims are 942,527, Hindus 106,974, and Christians 1420. The Hindu population fell from a high of 113,000 in 1981 to 106,000 in 2011.

Places of interest
Podamdi and Kurshi are also known for Nawabs which was originally the subedar (provincial governor) or viceroy of a subah (province) or region of the Mughal empire. It became a high title for Muslim nobles.

Dighi (a kind of water body) in Rajbari include Kallyan Dighi, situated in Baliakandi of Islampur union. Rajbari is situated by the bank of Padma River.

'Godar Bazar' bank of Padma River near at Rajbari town.

Notable people
 AKM Aszad, politician
 Lieutenant General S. M. Matiur Rahman
 Ali Newaz Mahmud Khaiyam, former MP
 Jahanara Begum, politician
 Kazi Abdul Wadud, dramatist
 Maulvi Tamizuddin Khan, former Speaker of the Constituent Assembly of Pakistan
 Md. Abdul Wajed Chowdhury, politician
 Monsur Ul Karim, painter
 Padamdi Zamindar family
Mir Mosharraf Hossain, novelist and playwright
Syed Mir Ali Imam Al Mamun, former Bangladesh Army officer
 Qazi Motahar Hossain, scientist, author and teacher
 Rowshan Ali Chowdhury, journalist
 Yakub Ali Chowdhury, essayist
 Salma Chowdhury, MP
 NIbedita Das, Swimmer 
 Shohely Akhter, cricketer
 Satish Chandra Vidyabhusan, eminent Sanskrit scholar
 Kangalini Sufia, folk singer

See also
 Districts of Bangladesh
 Rajdharpur

Notes

References 

 
Districts of Bangladesh